Statistics of Latvian Higher League in the 1930 season.

Overview
It was contested by 7 teams, and RFK won the championship.

League standings

References
RSSSF

Latvian Higher League seasons
1
Latvia
Latvia